Gamma-aminobutyric acid receptor subunit theta is a protein that in humans is encoded by the GABRQ gene.  The protein encoded by this gene is a subunit of the GABAA receptor.

The θ subunit has highest sequence similarity with the β1 subunit. This subunit coassembles with:
 α2, β1, and γ1
 α3 and β1
 α3, β1, and ε.

References

Further reading

External links 
 

Ion channels